Eintracht Frankfurt e.V. is a German professional sports club based in Frankfurt, Hesse. It is best known for its football club, which was founded on 8 March 1899. The club is currently playing in the Bundesliga, the top tier of the German football league system and is the current UEFA Europa League holder. Eintracht have won the German championship once, the DFB-Pokal five times, the UEFA Europa League twice and finished as runner-up in the European Cup once. The team was one of the founding members of the Bundesliga at its inception and has spent a total of 54 seasons in the top division, thus making them the seventh longest participating club in the highest tier of the league.

Since 1925 their stadium has been the Waldstadion, which is currently named Deutsche Bank Park for sponsorship reasons.

Eintracht Frankfurt have enjoyed some success in the Bundesliga, having either won or drawn more than three-quarters of their games as well as having finished the majority of their seasons placed in the top half of the table, but also having the highest number of losses in the league (657). With an average attendance of 47,942 since 2013 the team also boasts one of the highest attendance ratings in the world and the eighth highest out of the 36 Bundesliga and 2. Bundesliga teams. The player with the highest number of appearances (602) in the Bundesliga, Charly Körbel, spent his entire senior career as a defender for Eintracht Frankfurt. The club's primary rival is local club Kickers Offenbach, although, due to spending most of their history in different divisions, the two have only played two league matches within the last 40 years.

History

Club origins

The origins of the club go back to a pair of football clubs founded in 1899: Frankfurter Fußball-Club Viktoria von 1899 – regarded as the original team in the club's history – and Frankfurter Fußball-Club Kickers von 1899. Both clubs were founding members of the new Nordkreis-Liga in 1909. These two teams merged in May 1911 to become Frankfurter Fußball Verein (Kickers-Viktoria), an instant success, taking three league titles from 1912 to 1914 in the Nordkreis-Liga and qualifying for the Southern German championship in each of those seasons. In turn, Frankfurter FV joined the gymnastics club Frankfurter Turngemeinde von 1861 to form TuS Eintracht Frankfurt von 1861 in 1920. The German word Eintracht means 'harmony' or 'concord', and so Eintracht is the equivalent of United in English in the names of sports teams.
At the time, sports in Germany was dominated by nationalistic gymnastics organizations, and under pressure from that sport's governing authority, the gymnasts and footballers went their separate ways again in 1927, as Turngemeinde Eintracht Frankfurt von 1861 and Sportgemeinde Eintracht Frankfurt (FFV) von 1899.

Through the late 1920s and into the 1930s, Eintracht won a handful of local and regional championships, first in the Kreisliga Nordmain, then in the Bezirksliga Main and Bezirksliga Main-Hessen. After being eliminated from the national level playoffs after quarterfinal losses in 1930 and 1931, they won their way to the final in 1932 where they were beaten 2–0 by Bayern Munich, who claimed their first ever German championship. In 1933, German football was re-organized into sixteen Gauligen under the Third Reich and the club played first division football in the Gauliga Südwest, consistently finishing in the upper half of the table and winning their division in 1938.

Eintracht picked up where they left off after World War II, joining the new first division Oberliga Süd. In 1946, Eintracht won the first Hessenpokal, and finished 3rd in the Oberliga Süd a year later. In 1953, they would win the Oberliga Süd title, qualifying Eintracht for the German championship, though they did not make it to the final.

National champions and European Cup finalists 
Former coach Paul Oßwald returned to the club for third stint with Eintracht in 1958. In the 1958-59 season the club won their Oberliga again, qualifying for the 1959 German championship. Winning all 6 of the games in the group phase, Eintracht made it to the final with a perfect record; there, they would meet rivals Kickers Offenbach, the club that Oßwald joined from, and the runners up behind Eintracht in the Oberliga Süd. Frankfurt went on to win the final 5-3 after extra time, becoming German champions for the first and so far only time in front of 75,000 fans in Berlin's Olympiastdion.

As champions, Frankfurt would represent Germany in the 1959–60 European Cup, where they would come to international prominence. Having beaten BSC Young Boys and Wiener Sport-Club to make it to the semi-finals, they were drawn against Scottish champions Rangers, who were considered favourites, at least in Scotland - Rangers manager Scot Symon allegedly asked, "Eintracht, who are they?" before the game. Eintracht won the first leg 6-1 at home, in a performance described as the greatest in the club's history. They would score six more in the second leg at Ibrox, winning 12-4 on aggregate. After the game, the Rangers players gave their opponents a guard of honour as they left the pitch.

Eintracht would return to Glasgow for the final at Hampden Park, although they lost 7–3 to Real Madrid despite taking an early lead. The final was widely regarded as one of the best football matches ever played, remembered for a hat-trick by Alfredo Di Stéfano and four goals by Ferenc Puskás.

After their championship-winning year, Eintracht did not win the Oberliga again, though they were runners-up in 1961 and 1962. Both times they would finish second in the group phase of the German championship, missing out on the final.

Founding member of the Bundesliga

The side earned themselves a place as one of the original 16 teams selected to play in the Bundesliga, Germany's new professional football league, formed in 1963. Eintracht played Bundesliga football for 33 consecutive seasons, finishing in the top half of the table for the majority of them. In the inaugural season, Eintracht finished 3rd behind 1. FC Köln and Meidericher SV - the club has still never managed a better Bundesliga finish - and also reached the 1964 DFB-Pokal Final.

Eintracht finished in the top half of the Bundesliga every season until 1970–71. Although they didn't make it back to the European Cup, Eintracht did play in other non-UEFA European competitions, beating FK Inter Bratislava to win the 1967 Intertoto Cup in the last season of its original format. That year, they also reached the semi-final of the Inter-Cities Fairs Cup, losing to Dinamo Zagreb.

Cup successes 
From 1973 to 1981, Eintracht had arguably their most successful period of the Bundesliga era, winning 3 DFB-Pokals and the UEFA Cup. Many of the most iconic players from the club's history played during this era, such as Bernd Nickel, Charly Körbel, Bernd Hölzenbein, Jürgen Grabowski and Cha Bum-kun.

The first title success came under Dietrich Weise in the 1973–74 DFB-Pokal, winning 3-1 in the final over Hamburger SV -  due to the 1974 FIFA World Cup, which Hölzenbein and Grabowski had won with West Germany, the final wasn't played until August 1974.

Eintracht would win the cup again in 1975, beating MSV Duisburg 1-0. That season, they played in the European Cup Winners' Cup for the first time, and in the 1975–76 campaign, they would go far, reaching the semi-finals. Despite beating opponents West Ham 2-1 at home, Eintracht were beaten 3-1 in the second leg and were knocked out, while also finishing a relatively low 9th place in the Bundesliga. The club then had a difficult start to the 1976-77 season, but under new coach Gyula Lóránt, appointed in November, Eintracht went unbeaten in the second half of the season. Lóránt, notable for introducing zonal marking to the Bundesliga, took Frankfurt into 4th place by the end of the season, finishing only two points behind champions Borussia Mönchengladbach. Soon, however, Lóránt would leave for Bayern Munich, with Dettmar Cramer coming the other way to coach Frankfurt. Cramer left at the end of the disappointing 1977–78 season, replaced by Otto Knefler, who soon had to leave on health grounds.

In January 1979, Friedel Rausch joined the club as the new coach. This was one of two important arrivals in 1979, as Cha Bum-kun would sign for Eintracht in July, becoming the first Korean to play in Europe. He would quickly become an icon in Frankfurt, scoring 12 league goals in his debut season. Eliminating Aberdeen, Dinamo București, Feyenoord and FC Zbrojovka Brno in the earlier rounds of the UEFA Cup, Eintracht made it to the semi-finals, at which point only West German teams remained. Drawn against Bayern Munich, Eintracht pulled off a 5-1 win in extra time against the Bavarians to take their place in the final.

Rausch's side lost 3-2 in the first leg of the final to Borussia Mönchengladbach, the reigning champions. The two away goals, scored by Harald Karger and Hölzenbein, would prove crucial. Two weeks later, Eintracht hosted the return leg. With the score remaining 0-0 until late on, Rausch sent on teenager Fred Schaub with 13 minutes to play. Almost immediately, Schaub scored what proved to be only goal of the game, giving Eintracht the title on away goals.

Now coached by Lothar Buchmann, Eintracht won the 1980–81 DFB-Pokal, their 3rd Pokal victory. This effectively marked the end of Eintracht's golden period, as they began to struggle against relegation.

Mid-80s struggles and 1988 DFB-Pokal 
In 1984, they defeated MSV Duisburg 6–1 on aggregate in the relegation playoff after finishing 16th; in 1986 and 1987, they would finish 15th.

After years as a bottom-half club in the Bundesliga, Eintracht had a successful 1987–88 season, finishing in the top half of the league for the first time since 1982. More importantly, they won the 1987–88 DFB-Pokal, with a 1-0 win over VfL Bochum in the 1988 final. The goalscorer was Hungarian Lajos Détári, who became a hero among the club's fans. Only two days after the final, Détári was sold to Olympiacos for a large fee, helping to pay the club's debts.

In 1988-89 Eintracht found themselves in the relegation fight again. Jörg Berger was appointed coach and led the side to safety with a 4-1 aggregate win over 1. FC Saarbrücken in the relegation playoff.

Title challenges in the early 90s and first relegation 
A year later, Berger had taken the club to 3rd place, and was recognised as the best coach in the league. Berger left in 1991 after a 4th place finish, but the squad now included players considered among the Bundesliga's best, such as Uwe Bein, Uli Stein, Jørn Andersen, Manfred Binz, Tony Yeboah and Andreas Möller.

Dragoslav Stepanović took over as coach when Berger left, and Eintracht would finish 3rd in both seasons he coached, although he left before the end of 1992–93. Under Stepanović, Eintracht played what was considered some of the best football in Bundesliga history, making 'Stepi' a fan favourite to this day. In 1991-92, the club came closer than ever before to winning the Bundesliga. Going into the last game of the season, Eintracht were top of the table and only needed a win against already-relegated Hansa Rostock. With the scores level at 1-1 Eintracht were denied what seemed a clear penalty, they would go on to lose 2-1. Referee Alfons Berg later apologised for his decision, but VfB Stuttgart became champions. Eintracht also came close in 1993-94, under Klaus Toppmöller, leading the table at the halway point; however, they fell to 5th place and Toppmöller was sacked.

In the summer of 1994, Jupp Heynckes was appointed coach. Things quickly began to turn sour, as Heynckes fell out with key players Tony Yeboah, Maurizio Gaudino and Jay-Jay Okocha. The club suspended all three players; Yeboah and Gaudino soon left. With the club in 13th, Heynckes decided to leave. For his role in breaking up the successful side of the early 90s, Heynckes is still reviled by many fans in Frankfurt.

Relegation would come in 1995–96, with neither club legend Charly Körbel or the previously successful Dragoslav Stepanovic able to rescue Eintracht. After 33 consecutive years in the Bundesliga, Frankfurt went down alongside 1. FC Kaiserslautern, who had also been ever-present until 1996.

Turbulent years 
After a tumultuous debut campaign in the 2. Bundesliga, Eintracht won the title in 1997–98 and returned to the Bundesliga. Promotion coach Horst Ehrmantraut left in December, and Jörg Berger returned to try to save Eintracht once more. On the final day of the 1998–99 season, Eintracht were expected to be relegated, but dramatically climbed out of the relegation zone on goal difference thanks to a late goal from Jan Åge Fjørtoft giving them a 5-1 win over Kaiserslautern.

The following year, in another struggle to avoid relegation, the club was docked two points for violating the conditions of their license. Eintracht secured survival on the last day of the season with a win over SSV Ulm, who were relegated instead. Eintracht would go down the season afterwards with Friedel Rausch in charge, and did not come close to promotion in 2001–02.

Eintracht secured a Bundesliga return on the final day of the 2002–03 season with a 6-3 win over Reutlingen, dramatically scoring 3 in the last 10 minutes of the game. They were then relegated straight back to the 2. Bundesliga, but were promoted again the season after, managed by Friedhelm Funkel. Funkel led the team to safety in 2005–06 and also took Eintracht to the DFB-Pokal final for the first time since 1988, where they lost to Bayern Munich. As Bayern had already qualified for Europe, this also meant that Eintracht qualified for the UEFA Cup. After years of stability under Funkel, Michael Skibbe replaced him in 2009.

The 2010–11 season ended with the club's fourth Bundesliga relegation. After setting a new record for most points in the first half of the season, the club struggled after the winter break, going seven games without scoring a goal. Coach Skibbe was replaced with Christoph Daum, but Eintracht went down again after winning just once in the second half of the season.

One year later, Eintracht defeated Alemannia Aachen 3–0 on the 32nd matchday of the 2011–12 season, securing promotion to the Bundesliga. This was followed up by a 6th place finish in the Bundesliga in 2012–13, qualifying Frankfurt for the Europa League.

DFB Pokal and Europa League winners, Champions League participants

Having finished in the top half in 2014-15, a season in which Eintracht's Alexander Meier was the league's top scorer, the team struggled again in 2015-16 and Niko Kovač was appointed coach in March 2016. Frankfurt survived only through the relegation playoff; ending the season in 16th place, they beat 1. FC Nürnberg 2-1 on aggregate in the playoff. In Kovač's first full year, his team survived comfortably and also reached the final of the 2017 DFB-Pokal, where they were beaten by Borussia Dortmund.

Eintracht reached their second DFB-Pokal final in a row in 2017–18, this time winning 3–1 against heavy favourites Bayern Munich - who Kovač had already agreed to join from next season. He was replaced by Adi Hütter.

In 2018-19, Eintracht's attacking trio of Luka Jović, Ante Rebić and Sébastien Haller won lots of praise for their outstanding performances, scoring 41 league goals and 16 Europa League goals between them and earning the nickname "the Buffalo Herd".  Making only their second appearance in the modern Europa League, Eintracht won all six group games against Lazio, Apollon Limassol and Marseille, and beat highly-rated opponents Shakhtar Donetsk, Inter Milan and Benfica. In the semi-finals against Chelsea, Eintracht drew both legs 1-1 but ended up losing on penalties at Stamford Bridge. Chelsea would go on to win the tournament. Eintracht also missed out on Champions League qualification in the Bundesliga, dropping from 4th to 7th after losing their last two games.

With Jović, Rebić and Haller all leaving in the summer of 2019, Eintracht regressed in 2019–20 and failed to qualify for Europe, but returned to the Europa League with a 5th place finish in 2020-21, after which Adi Hütter left for Borussia Mönchengladbach. In the 2021–22 Europa League, Eintracht topped their group and stunned Barcelona in the quarter finals, taking a 3-0 lead at the Camp Nou and eventually winning 3-2 with approximately 30,000 travelling Frankfurt fans in attendance. Eintracht went on to beat West Ham home and away in the semi-finals to set up their first European final since 1980.

In the final in Seville's Ramón Sánchez Pizjuán Stadium, Frankfurt beat Rangers 5–4 on penalties after a 1–1 draw in extra-time, with Rafael Santos Borré scoring Eintracht's goal and the winning penalty. Goalkeeper Kevin Trapp was named man of the match in the final after making a crucial late save from Ryan Kent and saving Aaron Ramsey's penalty in the shootout. Eintracht won the competition unbeaten; their success also qualified them for the 2022–23 UEFA Champions League, Eintracht's first appearance in the competition since 1960.

Colours, logo and nicknames
The club logo derives from the coat of arms of the city of Frankfurt, which itself is a reference to the one-headed imperial eagle of the 13th century.

The logo has evolved slowly over time, showing little significant change until 1980, when a stylized eagle in black and white was chosen to represent the team. In Eintracht's centenary year of 1999, the club decided to re-adopt a more traditional eagle logo. Since 2005, Eintracht has had a living mascot, a golden eagle named Attila from the nearby Hanau Zoo, who has currently been present at over 200 different games.

The official club colours of red, black, and white have their origins in the colours of the founding clubs Frankfurter FC Viktoria and Frankfurter FC Kickers, which sported red and white and black and white respectively. Red and white are the colours of the city coat of arms, and black and white the colours of Prussia. When the clubs merged, officials decided to adopt the colours of both sides. Since local rival Kickers Offenbach sport the colours red and white, Eintracht avoids playing in such a kit, preferring to play in black and red, or in black and white. The current home kit is white with black trim, though the club also has an all-black kit used in European competitions.

The club is nicknamed "Die Adler" ("The Eagles"), which derives from their logo. A nickname still popular among supporters is SGE, taken from the club's old official name Sportgemeinde Eintracht (Frankfurt), which roughly translates into English as "Sports Community Harmony."

The nickname Launische Diva ("Moody Diva") was heard most often in the early 1990s when the club would comfortably defeat top teams only to surprisingly lose to lesser clubs.

The nickname Schlappekicker ("Slipper Kickers") has been around since the 1920s, when J. & C. A. Schneider, a local manufacturer of shoes and especially slippers (called Schlappe in the regional Hessian dialect) was a major financial backer of the club and helped propel it to national relevance.

Since June 2021 the executive board consists of Axel Hellmann (head of marketing and fan relations), Markus Krösche (head of sports) and Oliver Frankenbach (head of finances).

Honours

National
 German Championship
 Champions: 1959
 Runners-up: 1932
 DFB-Pokal
 Winners: 1973–74, 1974–75, 1980–81, 1987–88, 2017–18
 Runners-up: 1963–64, 2005–06, 2016–17
 2. Bundesliga
 Winners: 1997–98
 Runners-up: 2011–12
 DFB / DFL-Supercup
 Runners-up: 1988, 2018

Continental
 European Cup / UEFA Champions League
 Runners-up: 1959–60
 UEFA Cup / UEFA Europa League
 Winners: 1979–80, 2021–22
 Intertoto Cup
 Winners: 1967
 UEFA Super Cup
 Runners-up: 2022

Friendly
 Cup of the Alps
 Winners: 1967

Regional
 Southern German Championship
 Champions: 1929–30, 1931–32
 Runners-up: 1912–13+, 1913–14+, 1927–28, 1930–31
 Oberliga Süd
 Champions: 1952–53, 1958–59
 Runners-up: 1953–54, 1960–61, 1961–62
 Nordkreis-Liga
 Champions: 1911–12+, 1912–13+, 1913–14+
 Kreisliga Nordmain
 Champions: 1919–20+, 1920–21
 Runners-up: 1921–22
 Bezirksliga Main-Hessen:
 Champions: 1927–28, 1928–29, 1929–30, 1930–31, 1931–32
 Runners-up: 1932–33
 Gauliga Südwest/Mainhessen:
 Champions: 1937–38
 Runners-up: 1936–37
 Hesse Cup (Tiers 3–7):
 Winners: 1946, 1969*
 Runners-up: 1949
 Hesse Championship (Tier 3 & 4):
 Champions: 1970*, 2002*
 Runners-up: 1978*, 1983*, 1995*
 + As Frankfurter FV
 * Achieved by Reserve Team

League results

Recent seasons

All time

Green denotes the highest level of football in Germany; yellow the second highest.

Players

Current squad

Players out on loan

Kit history
 Current sport brand: Nike
 Home kit: Black shirt with horizontal red lines, black shorts and black socks
 Away kit: White shirt with details on red, white shorts and white socks
 3rd kit: Yellow or red shirt, yellow or red shorts and yellow or red socks

Sponsoring

Current club staff

Club presidents

 Wilhelm Schöndube (1920–1926)
 Fritz Steffan /  Heinrich Berger (1926–1927)
 Horst Rebenschütz (1927)
 Egon Graf von Beroldingen (1927–1933)
 Hans Söhngen (1933–1939)
 Rudolf Gramlich /  Adolf Metzner (1939–1942)
 Anton Gentil (1942–1945) (temporary)
 Christian Kiefer (1945–1946) (temporary)
 Günther Reis (1946)
 Robert Brubacher (1946–1949)
 Anton Keller (1949–1955)
 Rudolf Gramlich (1955–1969)
 Albert Zellekens (1970–1973)
 Achaz von Thümen (1973–1981)
 Axel Schander (1981–1983)
 Klaus Gramlich (1983–1988)
 Joseph Wolf (1988)
 Matthias Ohms (1988–1996)
 Dieter Lindner (1996) (temporary)
 Hans-Joachim Otto (1996)
 Rolf Heller (1996–2000)
 Peter Fischer (2000–)

Coaches

 Albert Sohn (1919)
 Dori Kürschner (1921–1922)
 Maurice Parry (1925–1926)
 Fritz Egly /  Walter Dietrich (1926–1927)
 Gustav Wieser (October 1927 – May 1928)
 Paul Oßwald (1928 – August 1933)
 Willi Spreng (1933–1935)
 Paul Oßwald (1935–1938)
 Otto Boer (1939) (caretaker)
 Péter Szabó (1939)
 Willi Lindner (1941) (caretaker)
 Péter Szabó (1942) (caretaker)
 Willi Balles (1942) (caretaker)
 Willy Pfeiffer (1945) (caretaker)
 Sepp Herberger (1945) (caretaker)
 Emil Melcher (1946)
 Willi Treml (1947)
 Bernhard Kellerhoff (1948 – December 1948)
 Walter Hollstein (January 1949 – Summer 1950)
 Kurt Windmann (Summer 1950 – July 1956)
 Adolf Patek (July 1956 – April 1958)
 Paul Oßwald (April 1958 – April 1964)
 Ivica Horvat (April 1964 – June 1965)
 Elek Schwartz (July 1965 – June 1968)
 Erich Ribbeck (July 1968 – June 1973)
 Dietrich Weise (July 1973 – June 1976)
 Hans-Dieter Roos (July 1976 – November 1976)
 Gyula Lóránt (November 1976 – November 1977)
 Jürgen Grabowski (December 1977) (caretaker)
 Dettmar Cramer (December 1977 – June 1978)
 Otto Knefler (July 1978 – December 1978)
 Udo Klug (December 1978 – January 1979) (caretaker)
 Friedel Rausch (January 1979 – June 1980)
 Lothar Buchmann (July 1980 – June 1982)
 Helmut Senekowitsch (July 1982 – September 1982)
 Branko Zebec (September 1982 – October 1983)
 Jürgen Grabowski (October 1983) (caretaker)
 Klaus Mank (October 1983) (caretaker)
 Dietrich Weise (October 1983 – December 1986)
 Timo Zahnleiter (December 1986 – June 1987)
 Karl-Heinz Feldkamp (July 1987 – September 1988)
 Pál Csernai (September 1988 – December 1988)
 Jörg Berger (December 1988 – April 1991)
 Dragoslav Stepanović (April 1991 – March 1993)
 Horst Heese (March 1993 – June 1993)
 Klaus Toppmöller (July 1993 – April 1994)
 Charly Körbel (April 1994 – June 1994) (caretaker)
 Jupp Heynckes (July 1994 – April 1995)
 Charly Körbel (April 1995 – March 1996)
 Dragoslav Stepanović (April 1996 – December 1996)
 Rudolf Bommer (December 1996) (caretaker)
 Horst Ehrmantraut (December 1996 – December 1998)
 Bernhard Lippert (December 1998 – January 1999) (caretaker)
 Reinhold Fanz (December 1998 – April 1999)
 Jörg Berger (April 1999 – December 1999)
 Felix Magath (December 1999 – January 2001)
 Rolf Dohmen (January 2001 – April 2001) (caretaker)
 Friedel Rausch (April 2001 – May 2001)
 Martin Andermatt (June 2001 – March 2002)
 Armin Kraaz (March 2002 – May 2002) (caretaker)
 Willi Reimann (July 2002 – May 2004)
 Friedhelm Funkel (July 2004 – June 2009)
 Michael Skibbe (July 2009 – March 2011)
 Christoph Daum (March 2011 – May 2011)
 Armin Veh (July 2011 – July 2014)
 Thomas Schaaf (July 2014 – June 2015)
 Armin Veh (June 2015 – March 2016)
 Niko Kovač (March 2016 – June 2018)
 Adi Hütter (July 2018 – June 2021)
 Oliver Glasner (July 2021 – )

Records

 Home victory, Bundesliga: 9–1 v Rot-Weiss Essen, 5 October 1974
 Away victory, Bundesliga: 8–1 v Rot-Weiss Essen, 7 May 1977
 Home loss, Bundesliga: 0–7 v Karlsruher SC, 19 September 1964
 Away loss, Bundesliga: 0–7 v 1. FC Köln, 29 October 1983
 Highest home attendance: 81,000 v FK Pirmasens, 23 May 1959
 Highest away attendance: 127,621 v Real Madrid, Hampden Park, Glasgow, 18 May 1960
 Highest average attendance, season: 49,176, 2016–17
 Most appearances, all competitions total: 720, Charly Körbel (1972–1991)
 Most appearances, Bundesliga: 602, Charly Körbel (1972–1991)
 Most goals scored, all competitions total: 225, Karl Ehmer (1927–1938)
 Most goals scored, Bundesliga: 160, Bernd Hölzenbein (1967–1981)
 Most goals scored, season, Bundesliga: 28, André Silva, 2020–21
 Richard Kress, (born 6 March 1925) is the oldest Bundesliga rookie, making his debut at 38 years and 171 days on the opening day of league play on 24 August 1963. He scored his first Bundesliga goal at 38 years and 248 days of age.
 Eintracht hold the record for most consecutive away games without a win (32) from 20 August 1985 to 25 August 1987.

Stadium

The club's initial games from 1899 to 1906 were played on the former Hundswiese field, whose present day location would be near Hessischer Rundfunk. Following new regulations that pitches needed to be surrounded by a fence for the purpose of official games, the team established a new pitch by the Eschersheimer Landstraße called Victoriaplatz in 1906, for which they purchased stands at a price of 350 marks in 1908. From 1912 the team moved to a new ground at Roseggerstraße in Dornbusch with more facilities, before relocating to the former Riederwaldstadion in 1920 following the fusion of Frankfurter FV and Frankfurter Turngemeinde von 1861.

The ground was inaugurated as Waldstadion ("Forest Stadium") in 1925 with the German championship final match between FSV Frankfurt vs. 1. FC Nürnberg.

The facility was renovated for the FIFA World Cup 2006 in Germany. For Bundesliga fixtures the maximum capacity is 51,500 as on the East Stand next to the visitor's terrace some spaces are held free for security purposes.

Though the media usually refer to the ground by the official name, Deutsche Bank Park, Eintracht fans faithful typically use the original name, Waldstadion.

Reserve team

Eintracht Frankfurt U21 is the reserve team of Eintracht Frankfurt. The team played as U23 (Under 23) to emphasize the character of the team as a link between the youth academy and professional team. The club board decided to dissolve the team after the 2013–14 season while playining in the regular league system in the fourth tier, the Regionalliga Süd. 
On 14 February 2022 Eintracht Frankfurt applied to have a reserves team to be re-admitted to the 5th tier Hessenliga for the 2022–23 season.

Rivalries and friendships
The club's main rival is from across the Main river, the side Kickers Offenbach. The clubs played the 1959 German championship final, which Eintracht won.

Eintracht also maintain rivalries with Darmstadt 98 regionally, known as the Hesse derby, as well with 1. FSV Mainz 05 and 1. FC Kaiserslautern in Rhineland-Palatinate.

The club's original rival was Frankfurt city-rival FSV Frankfurt. In both clubs' early years, there used to be a fierce rivalry, but after World War II Eintracht proved to be the stronger club and the ways parted and the rivalry deteriorated due to lack of contact. Nowadays, the fan relations tend to be friendly. 
The 2011–12 season saw Eintracht play FSV in a league match for the first time in almost 50 years. The last league game between the two had been played on 27 January 1962, then in the Oberliga Süd. For the first of the two matches, FSV's home game on 21 August 2011, the decision was made to move to Eintracht's stadium as FSV's Bornheimer Hang only holds less than 11,000 spectators. Eintracht won 4–0. The second match on 18 February 2012 ended in another victory for Eintracht, a 6–1 rout.

A friendship between two Eintracht fan clubs and supporters of English club Oldham Athletic has lasted for over 30 years after fans from each club met at an international football tournament. Small sections of each club's support will pay a visit to the other's ground at least once a season. Eintracht supporters also have an international friendship with supporters of Italian club Atalanta.

Other sections within the club

The sports club Eintracht Frankfurt e.V. is made up of nineteen sections:

 Gymnastics (since 22 January 1861)
 Football (since 8 March 1899)
 Athletics (since 1899)
 Field hockey (since 1906 as "1.Frankfurter Hockeyclub)
 Boxing (since 1919)
 Tennis (since spring 1920)
 Handball (since 1921)
 Rugby (since summer 1923 – see Eintracht Frankfurt Rugby)
 Table tennis (since November 1924)
 Basketball (since 4 June 1954)
 Ice stock sport (since 9 December 1959)
 Volleyball (since July 1961)
 Football supporter's section (since 11 December 2000)
 Ice hockey (1959 to 1991 and again since 1 July 2002)
 Darts (since 1 July 2006)
 Triathlon (since January 2008)
 Ultimate (since 2015)
 Table football (since July 2016)
 Esports (since June 2019)

Betty Heidler, the hammer throw world champion of 2007, was a member of the Eintracht Frankfurt athletics team. Other Eintracht athletes include the 2008 Olympians Andrea Bunjes, Ariane Friedrich, Kamghe Gaba and Kathrin Klaas.

The club's rugby union section twice reached the final of the German rugby union championship, in 1940 and 1965.

Within the football section, the sports club directly manages only the youth system and the reserve team. The professional footballers are managed as a separate limited corporation, Eintracht Frankfurt Fußball-AG, which is a subsidiary of the parent club.

See also
 List of Eintracht Frankfurt players
 List of Eintracht Frankfurt records and statistics
 Eintracht Frankfurt in European football
 Eintracht Frankfurt II
 Eintracht Frankfurt Women
 Eintracht Frankfurt Basketball
 Eintracht Frankfurt Rugby

References

External links

 
First official fansite 
Official stadium website 
Eintracht Frankfurt statistics
Rugby section 

 
Football clubs in Germany
Eintracht
Association football clubs established in 1899
Multi-sport clubs in Germany
1899 establishments in Frankfurt
Athletics clubs in Germany
UEFA Cup winning clubs
UEFA Europa League winning clubs
Bundesliga clubs
2. Bundesliga clubs